Mendota is a city in LaSalle County, Illinois, United States, in the state's north-central region. The population was 7,061 at the 2020 census. It is part of the Ottawa, IL Micropolitan Statistical Area. Mendota is located approximately 85 miles west of Chicago, 70 miles east of Moline and 55 miles south of Rockford. The current mayor is David W. Boelk, an independent elected to a four-year term.

The name "Mendota" is derived from a Lakota word meaning "junction of two trails", which was found appropriate for the city since there was a nearby railroad junction for the Illinois Central Railroad and the Chicago, Burlington and Quincy Railroad.

History

In summer of 1853, the Illinois Central Railroad was completed and by the fall of that year, the Chicago, Burlington and Quincy Railroad completed a crossing at the present site of Mendota. By the following year, the population had grown to more than 1,000 and the town was home to saloons, hotels, and various shops. The town was incorporated as a village in 1855 and reincorporated as a town in 1859. By 1860, the town was also home to churches of 5 denominations. 

With the availability of the railroads to facilitate export, several manufactures of items ranging from organs to cigars and buttons opened factories in Mendota. By the end of the American civil war, the population of the town had more than doubled to over 2,000. By winter of 1866, citizens voted on a referendum to secure a city government. Mendota was incorporated into its current city government on April 9, 1867.

A library was opened on September 8, 1874 with 1700 books secured by donation. It was acquired by the city government in 1894. The original building was replaced in 1905 by a new Carnegie Library.

A new Union station was opened on February 23, 1888 to replace the original depot which had burned down in 1885. The new building contained a hotel, restaurants, and separate waiting areas for passengers and railroad staff. Because of falling revenue and ridership, much of the station was torn down in 1942. The current Mendota station is the only remaining portion of the original structure.

Geography

Mendota Creek, a south flowing tributary of the Little Vermilion River, flows through downtown Mendota from its headwaters in the agricultural fields northwest of town. The creek was identified in 2014 as having chronic problems with dissolved oxygen and fecal coliform bacteria concentrations.

Demographics

As of the 2020 census there were 7,061 people, 2,788 households, and 1,921 families residing in the city. The racial makeup of the city was 73.4% White, 1.4% African American, 1.0% Native American, 0.9% Asian, 8.5% from other races, and 11.9% from two or more races. Hispanic or Latino of any race were 29.5% of the population.

There were 2,788 households, out of which 33.1% had children under the age of 18 living with them, 48.5% were married couples living together, 15.4% had a female householder with no husband present, and 31.1% were non-families. 26.3% of all households were made up of individuals, and 13.2% had someone living alone who was 65 years of age or older. The average household size was 2.42 and the average family size was 2.92.

The population consisted of 23.7% under 18 years of age and 18.6% who were 65 years of age or older. The median age was 39.5 years. For every 100 females there were 95.7 males.

The median income for a household in the city was $43,534. The per capita income for the city was $30.470. Median income for males was $43,926 and $26,643 for females. 5.9% of families and 11.2% of the population were below poverty level, including 14.9% of those under age 18 and 4.2% of those age 65 or over.

Economy

A number of businesses operate within Mendota including :
 Archer Daniels Midland (ADM), a grain processor.
 Del Monte Foods, a food processing company.  The Del Monte plant was slated to close at the end of the 2019 packing season, until a buyer was found later that year. The purchase is set to be completed in spring 2020.

Arts and culture

The Mendota Sweet Corn Festival attracts thousands of visitors each August; it features a parade, carnival, beer garden with live bands, free sweet corn cooked in a vintage steam engine, and other special events.  The city closes down several streets in the downtown area to host the annual event which is sponsored by Del Monte Foods. The Mendota Tri-County Fair is held every Labor Day weekend at the Mendota Fairgrounds. The fair hosts a carnival, beer garden, and several other events.

Museums

The Hume-Carnegie Museum showcases artifacts of local history, including items manufactured in Mendota and a small collection pertaining to Wild Bill Hickok, who was born in nearby Troy Grove. It is located in a former Carnegie library building in Veteran's Park.

The Union Depot Railroad Museum houses the current Amtrak station, several rooms of vintage railroad artifacts, passenger train cars from the 1930s and 1940s. It is also home to CB&Q No. 4978, a 2-8-2 class Locomotive built in September 1923 by Baldwin Locomotive Works.

The Breaking the Prairie Museum is a small barn replica showcasing a rotating display with one large item (a vintage tractor or large item of farm husbandry) and several smaller items. Adjacent to the barn is "The Country Chapel", a small church which is owned by the museum. Completed in 2004, it houses a restored pump organ from the 1880s. It is closed to the public, however special tours can be arranged by contacting the Mendota Historical Society Office.

Parks and recreation

The city has two man made lakes, Lake Mendota and Lake Kakusha, used for boating and fishing. Mendota also maintains a community swimming pool as well as several parks including Snyders Grove, a  reserve/park.

Education

Mendota has four public schools and one private school. The three public grade schools: Blackstone, Lincoln, and Northbrook are part of Mendota Consolidated Community School District 289; while the Mendota Township High School is district 280. Blackstone School houses kindergarten and first grade, and had an enrollment of 271 students in 2010. Lincoln School houses second through fourth grades, and had a student enrollment of 391 in 2010. Northbrook School is home to the fifth through eighth grades, as well as pre-kindergarten; and had an enrollment of 644 in 2010. The student enrollment of the high school in 2010 was 611 students. A new high school facility was built in 2002 at 2300 Main Street (U.S. Route 52). Holy Cross Roman Catholic Parish has a private school which educates students from pre-kindergarten through eighth grade.

Aurora University was originally chartered as Mendota College on the north side of Mendota where the high school was located from 1917 to 2003.

Wartburg College (now located in Waverly, Iowa) was located in Mendota from 1875 to 1885.

Media

Mendota has one weekly newspaper, The Mendota Reporter

Mendota has two commercialized radio stations.

Infrastructure

Transportation

Mendota is served by U.S Interstate 39, U.S. Route 34, U.S. Route 52, and many state highways including Illinois Route 251. Three Amtrak trains in each direction stop daily at the Mendota Amtrak station:  the Illinois Zephyr and Carl Sandburg between Chicago and Quincy, and the Southwest Chief from Chicago to Kansas City and Los Angeles. (The California Zephyr passes through without stopping.) There are also two small airports near-by.

Notable people

 William P. Bettendorf, inventor; city of Bettendorf, Iowa named for him; born in Mendota
 Bill Brown, former running back with the Minnesota Vikings
 Helen E. Hokinson, cartoonist for The New Yorker (1925–1949)
 Ray Jauch, running back for national champion 1958 Iowa Hawkeyes football team; pro football coach; born in Mendota
 James Massey, cryptographer; lived in Mendota
 Jason Pohl, motorcycle designer with Orange County Choppers; born in Mendota
 Frank Seno, NFL running back and defensive back for the Washington Redskins (1943–1944 and 1949), and Chicago Cardinals (1947–1948); born in Mendota
 Chase J. Sexton, professional motocross rider with Honda HRC
 David C. Shapiro, dentist and Illinois state legislator; born in Mendota
 Otto Vogel, outfielder for the Chicago Cubs; born in Mendota
 Deacon White, professional baseball pioneer in Hall of Fame; lived in Mendota

In popular culture

The Arctic Monkeys, an English rock band, filmed their music video "One For the Road" at the Tri-County Fairgrounds in September, 2013.

References

External links

 
Cities in Illinois
Cities in LaSalle County, Illinois
Populated places established in 1855
1855 establishments in Illinois
Ottawa, IL Micropolitan Statistical Area